Oliver Park (born 13 April 1986) is a British horror writer and director. He is best known for his 2015/2016 short horror Vicious, voted as one of the best short horror films ever made by Buzzfeed. He then went onto make his second short horror Still, released by Eli Roth's Crypt TV in 2017. Based in Los Angeles, Park is currently developing a number of feature-length film projects.

Early life 
Oliver Park was born on 13 April 1986 in Bath, United Kingdom. According to Park, he started writing scary stories and screenplays from a young age, before moving into acting and producing. He studied architecture at Cardiff Metropolitan University (formerly UWIC).

Career 
Throughout his twenties, Park had roles in various films and commercials, including Stop/Eject by fellow British filmmaker Neil Oseman, in which he appeared alongside The Worst Witch star Georgina Sherrington. The film was shortlisted for BAFTA 2015. Park also starred in Simon Pearce's 2014 short film Watch Over Me, which went on to win Best Action Short at the New York Film Festival.

In 2016, he released his first short horror, Vicious, which centres around a young woman who returns home one night to find the front door unlocked. The film quickly gained over one million views, winning eight awards including the Gold Award for Best International Film at Toronto After Dark 2015. It was picked up by dedicated horror short channel ALTER in 2019.    

In 2017, Park released his second short film, Still, which tells the story of an artist terrorised by a dark figure with a bag over its head. The film was picked up by Crypt TV in December 2017.

In June 2020, Park was reported to be directing a film in his feature directorial debut.
Under the working title Abyzou, filming began on January 25, 2021, at Nu Boyana Film Studios, in the midst the COVID-19 pandemic in Bulgaria. Safety measures the production crew followed included mask wearing and regular COVID tests and temperature checks.
The film was released under the title of The Offering by Decal on January 13, 2023.

Filmography

Awards and nominations

External links

References

1986 births
Living people
People from Bath, Somerset
English-language film directors
Horror film directors
English film directors